This is the discography for the Californian stoner rock musician Brant Bjork.

Solo albums
Brant Bjork
Jalamanta (October 11, 1999)
Brant Bjork & the Operators (April 30, 2002)
Keep Your Cool (October 21, 2003)
Local Angel (August 10, 2004)
Tres Dias (February 27, 2007)
Punk Rock Guilt (May 13, 2008)
Gods & Goddesses (March 30, 2010)
Tao of the Devil (September 30, 2016)
Europe '16 (September 22, 2017)
Mankind Woman (September 14, 2018)
Jacoozzi (April 5, 2019)
Brant Bjork (May 8, 2020)
Bougainvillea Suite (October 28, 2022)

Brant Bjork and the Bros
Saved by Magic (August 1, 2005)
Somera Sól (May 8, 2007)

Brant Bjork and the Low Desert Punk Band
Black Power Flower (November 17, 2014)

Group albums

Kyuss

De-Con

Fu Manchu

Ché

Mondo Generator

Vista Chino

Stöner

Collaborations

Singles
 "Controllers Destroyed (live)" (July 28, 2017) 
 "The Gree Heen (live)" (August 25, 2017)
 "Chocolatize" (July 3, 2018)
 "Swagger & Sway" (August 20, 2018)
 "Charlie Gin" (August 31, 2018)
 "Guerrilla Funk" (January 31, 2019)
 "Oui" (March 25, 2019)
 "Jungle in the Sound" (January 21, 2020)
 "Duke of Dynamite" (March 10, 2020)
 "Cleaning out the Ashtray" (April 28, 2020)
 "Trip on the Wine" (July 19, 2022)
 "Bread for Butter" (September 14, 2022)

References

 
Discographies of American artists
Rock music discographies